Natalia G. Berloff is a professor of applied mathematics at the University of Cambridge.  Her research includes the use of polaritons to simulate structures such as the classical XY model.

Early life and education
Berloff grew up in Russia. She earned her Ph.D. from Florida State University in 1996, under the supervision of Louis Norberg Howard.

Career
Berloff was a UC President's Research Fellow in the Department of Mathematics of the University of California, Los Angeles from 1997 to 1999, and continued there as PIC Assistant Professor from 1999 to 2002, when she became a Fellow of Jesus College, Cambridge, and a faculty member in the Department of Applied Mathematics and Theoretical Physics at Cambridge, where she is now Professor in Applied Mathematics.

From 2013 to 2016 she took a leave from Cambridge to serve as a Professor and Director of Photonics and Quantum Materials Program at the Skolkovo Institute of Science and Technology in Russia.

References

External links
Home page

Year of birth missing (living people)
Living people
Florida State University alumni
Fellows of Jesus College, Cambridge
20th-century Russian mathematicians
21st-century Russian mathematicians
20th-century women mathematicians
21st-century women mathematicians
Fluid dynamicists
Moscow State University alumni